Rupert George Rosenblum (born 1 January 1942) is a former Australian Rugby Union player for the Australian Wallabies.

Career
Rosenblum played 3 test matches in 1969-1970; at that point in time, he and Myer Rosenblum were the second* father and son to have represented Australia in Rugby union. The McLeans- Douglas James 1904-05 and Alexander Douglas 1933-36 were the first, despite claims to the contrary.

References

1942 births
Living people
Australia international rugby union players
Australian people of Belarusian-Jewish descent
Australian rugby union players
Jewish Australian sportspeople
Jewish rugby union players
People educated at Scots College (Sydney)
Rugby union players from Sydney
Rugby union fly-halves